Truckin' and Trakin' is an album by jazz pianist Junior Mance with saxophonist David "Fathead" Newman which was released on the Bee Hive label in 1984.

Reception

The Allmusic site awarded the album 4 stars and said: "Mance and tenor saxophonist David "Fathead" Newman make for a logical combination, since their soulful styles often straddle the boundary between jazz and R&B".

Track listing
 "Mean Old Amtrak" (Junior Mance) - 6:55
 "That Lucky Old Sun" (Beasley Smith, Haven Gillespie) - 5:15
 "Truckin'" (Hank Crawford) - 6:15
 "Funky Carnival" (Esmond Edwards) - 7:35
 "Miss Otis Regrets" (Cole Porter) - 5:59
 "Birks' Works (composition)" (Dizzy Gillespie) - 5:51

Personnel
Junior Mance - piano 
David "Fathead" Newman - tenor saxophone, flute
Martin Rivera - bass
Walt Bolden - drums

References

1984 albums
Junior Mance albums
Bee Hive Records albums
Albums produced by Bob Porter (record producer)